The Ramsey House in Shelby County, Kentucky was built around 1840 and was expanded around 1880.  It was listed on the National Register of Historic Places in 1988.

It was deemed significant as "a well-preserved example of the early 19th century (1810-1840) 1 3/4-story, hall-parlor (two- room) plan in Shelby County."

Slave quarters with brick chimneys, no longer surviving, were located east of the house.

References

National Register of Historic Places in Shelby County, Kentucky
Houses completed in 1840
Houses in Shelby County, Kentucky
Hall-parlor plan architecture in the United States
1840 establishments in Kentucky
Houses on the National Register of Historic Places in Kentucky